Frontal sulcus may refer to:

 Inferior frontal sulcus
 Superior frontal sulcus